Kres may refer to:

KRES, a radio station
Feliks W. Kres, Polish fantasy writer
Kres, California